Naushaba Burney (November 1932  – 11 February 2016) was a journalist from Pakistan. She was the country's first female journalist.

Background
Burney was born in Nagpur, British India (now in India) in November 1932. She had six siblings (4 brothers and 2 sisters) including Ameena Saiyid, the Managing Director of Oxford University Press, Karachi. At Partition, she migrated to Pakistan with her family. She was married to the journalist, Iqbal Hassan Burney, editor of Outlook Magazine, with whom she had one son and two daughters. She completed her Masters degree in Journalism at the University of California, Berkeley in the 1950s. She also taught journalism at the University of Karachi.

Career
Burney worked in a number of organisations including Pakistan International Airlines (PIA), Dawn newspaper and Aga Khan University, Karachi.

References

1932 births
2016 deaths
Pakistani women journalists
People from Karachi
Muhajir people
Writers from Nagpur